Hydrophilus caschmirensis, common name large scavenging water beetle, is a species of water scavenger beetle belonging to the family Hydrophilidae.

Description
Hydrophilus caschmirensis is dark brown or black. These beetles have streamlined bodies and heads adapted for aquatic life. The hindlegs are fringed with stiff hair useful in propelling this insect in the water. They gets oxygen from the air periodically visiting the surface. They feed on decaying vegetable matter.

Distribution
This species can be found in India & Pakistan.

References

 Inhs.illinois.edu
 Global Names
 Bishop Museum
 Cybernome
 Aquatic coleoptera of India

Hydrophilinae
Insects of Pakistan
Beetles described in 1844